The Knaresborough Hoard is a hoard of Romano-British metalwork from near Knaresborough, North Yorkshire. It is the largest hoard of Romano-British copper-alloy vessels discovered to date in Britain. A partial catalogue of the hoard was published by Eggers in 1966. Between 2019 and 2021 it was studied as part of the Knaresborough and Irchester Roman Hoards Project (KNIROH) at Newcastle University.

Discovery
The hoard was discovered near Knaresborough around 1864 by men working on a land drain. Recent research looked at several different antiquarian accounts of the discovery of the hoard and suggests that it was likely to have been found at Farnham, north of Knaresborough. In a 1876 lecture to the Yorkshire Philosophical Society Rev Canon James Raine records that the finders brought the hoard "in a large sack" to Thomas Gott. Gott donated 8 vessels to the Yorkshire Museum in 1864 and the remainder in 1876.

Contents of the hoard
The hoard is a mixed metalwork hoard. It contains several different copper alloy vessels: a large fluted bowl, six hemispherical 'Irchester' type bowls, four strainers with handles, a strainer bowl, a handled pan, two plates, a scale pan, and a large jar in the shape of a pottery vessel. Iron objects in the hoard include two iron axes, an adze, and a smith's cross-pane hammer. It can be dated to the 4th century on the basis of silver parallels of some of the vessel types in other Romano-British hoards. When it was originally discovered, the hoard was much larger. Thomas Gott was an ironmonger and it is recorded that a "servant" accidentally melted down a number of Roman vessels after erroneously thinking that they were scrap metal. The original hoard thus also contained: several other large copper alloy plates, flat plates with handles, other dishes and bowls, a "great quantity" of iron nails, and a fire grate.

Public display
The hoard as it survives was donated to the Yorkshire Museum in two batches in 1864 and 1876. The 1881 handbook to the museum records that it was on display in the 'Antiquities' room in the Hospitium in the York Museum Gardens.

See also
List of Roman hoards in Great Britain

References

Archaeological sites in North Yorkshire
Collections of the Yorkshire Museum
Knaresborough
1864 in England
1864 archaeological discoveries
Hoards from Roman Britain